Miesha Theresa Tate (born August 18, 1986) is an American professional mixed martial artist. She currently competes in the Ultimate Fighting Championship (UFC), in which she is a former UFC Women's Bantamweight Champion. Tate formerly competed for Strikeforce, in which she is a former Strikeforce Women's Bantamweight Champion. She was also the vice president of ONE Championship. As of March 7, 2023, she is #11 in the UFC women's bantamweight rankings.

Early life
Tate was born in the Seattle suburb Tacoma, Washington, to Michelle Tate, and was raised by Michelle and husband Robert Schmidt. A tomboy during her youth, she often socialized with the boys in her neighborhood on playgrounds. While attending Franklin Pierce High School, Tate sought a sport to participate in, and eventually chose amateur wrestling over basketball. She wrestled on the boys' team from her freshman year until graduation. "I got my butt kicked pretty hard for the first few weeks. I had no idea what I was doing, like a fish out of water," Tate recalled in 2011. During her senior year in 2005, she competed in the girls' state championship and won the title.

While Tate was attending Central Washington University, a friend of hers encouraged her to attend the mixed martial arts (MMA) club with her. "I went there, and it really was a bunch of wrestlers. I fit right in," Tate said.

Amateur fights
Tate was initially wary of competing in MMA, explaining that she "didn't want to get punched." After seeing her training partners perform in actual competition, Tate was encouraged to accept her first amateur bout in March 2006, in which she was matched against Elizabeth Posener, a Muay Thai specialist. During the first round, Tate wrestled Posener to the mat, but did not strike while holding her there, which prompted Tate's trainers to remind her to. In the second round, Posener bloodied Tate with a knee from inside a clinch. While looking back on the fight in 2012, Tate noted, "I finally realized what I was there to do, and accepted the harsh truth—this wasn't a wrestling match...it was a fight". Tate escaped a submission attempt and responded by "whaling down punches" while Posener was on her back for the remainder of the round. Despite her eagerness to continue, Tate's corner ended the bout after the second round due to the injury she had sustained. Tate later commented, "When I get hurt or damaged, I fight that much harder." She amassed a 5–1 amateur record in MMA before turning pro.

Mixed martial arts career
Tate made her professional debut in mixed martial arts in November 2007 at the one-night HOOKnSHOOT Women's Grand Prix. She defeated Jan Finney by decision, but was knocked out later in the night by a head-kick from eventual tournament champion Kaitlin Young. Throughout 2008 and 2009, Tate fought in several small organizations which did not regularly televise fights, defeating Jamie Lyn Welsh in CageSport MMA, Jessica Bednark in Freestyle Cage Fighting (FCF), and Dora Baptiste in Atlas Fights.

First MMA title
Tate captured the 135-pound FCF Women's Bantamweight Championship by defeating Liz Carreiro at Freestyle Cage Fighting 30 on April 4, 2009. After being knocked down in the first round, Tate gained control of the fight in the second and submitted Carreiro in the third. She defended the title once, defeating Valerie Coolbaugh by first-round armbar submission at FCF 38 in January 2010.

Strikeforce
On June 27, 2008, Tate debuted in Strikeforce, an MMA promotion based in San Jose, California, which televised bouts on Showtime and CBS. Fighting in the 135-pound bantamweight division, Tate defeated Elaina Maxwell by unanimous decision at Strikeforce: Melendez vs. Thomson.

After winning the FCF title in April 2009, she returned to Strikeforce at Strikeforce Challengers: Evangelista vs. Aina on May 15, 2009. Tate was originally scheduled to face Kim Couture, but Couture withdrew from the fight due to undisclosed reasons and Tate was matched up against Sarah Kaufman instead. In a competitive fight, Tate was defeated by unanimous decision, which marked the first time that Kaufman had gone to a decision.

After stepping away to defend her FCF title in January 2010, Tate faced Zoila Gurgel at Strikeforce Challengers: Johnson vs. Mahe on March 26, 2010. Tate won the fight by armbar submission in the second round.

Strikeforce Bantamweight Champion
Tate was then included in a one-night Strikeforce women's tournament on August 13, 2010, at Strikeforce Challengers: Riggs vs. Taylor. A random drawing was held on the day of the weigh-ins to determine first-round matchups and Tate faced Maiju Kujala in the opening round of the tournament. She defeated Kujala by unanimous decision after two rounds to advance to the tournament final. She then defeated Hitomi Akano by unanimous decision after three rounds to become Strikeforce Women's Bantamweight Tournament Champion.

Tate was scheduled to challenge Marloes Coenen for the Strikeforce Women's Bantamweight Championship on March 5, 2011, but withdrew from the fight after suffering a knee injury in training. The fight was rescheduled for Strikeforce: Fedor vs. Henderson on July 30, 2011. Going into the bout, Tate laughed while stating, "I'm going to try to kill her, I really am. I'm going to try to get to the point where the referee is fearful [for] her life and stops the fight. That's my goal."
Coenen, known for her jiu-jitsu pedigree, had never been submitted in a mixed martial arts bout. In the fourth round, Tate defeated Coenen via submission (arm-triangle choke) to become the new champion.

Following the fight, Tate stated, "I think I'm not in reality quite yet. I can't believe that I have a belt to take home with me. I really had to dig deep those last couple rounds. Like I said, I had a tough end to my training camp, but I just feel like I went out there and I did what I needed to do and I won the fight and I'm world champion."

Final Strikeforce fights
Tate's first title defense was expected to be against former opponent Sarah Kaufman. However, Ronda Rousey, a new Strikeforce fighter, offered to fight Kaufman for the top-contender spot, seeking a title shot against Tate specifically. "I really want to have a title fight against Miesha Tate. I don't want to take a risk on her losing," Rousey said.

Rousey later explained that she believed a title fight between herself and Tate would garner significant attention. Strikeforce officials eventually announced that Rousey would be Tate's first challenger.

As Rousey predicted, her bout with Tate was highly publicized in the months preceding it. Rousey had made her MMA debut in early 2011 and defeated all four of her opponents by first-round armbar submission. However, Tate did not believe that Rousey had earned a title shot, and felt that Rousey was largely gaining the opportunity due to being "pretty." The two engaged in a variety of trash-talk, with Rousey stating that she was "bored" while watching Tate's win over Coenen. Ultimately, Tate and Rousey headlined a Strikeforce show on March 3, 2012. This marked a then-rare occurrence of women being placed in the main event of an MMA card. The bout was televised on Showtime and introduced by Jimmy Lennon, Jr. Shortly after the fight began, Tate escaped Rousey's first armbar attempt and retaliated with strikes. After a back-and-forth session of grappling, Tate lost the title when Rousey secured a second armbar near the end of the first round, forcing her to submit.

Tate was criticized by the media for risking long-term damage to her arm by resisting the armbar for several moments. Rousey later stated, "Miesha impressed me, she's a tough chick 'cause that hurts. I've had my elbow dislocated before and that's no fun. The rule in judo is even if it's dislocated if they don't tap, then keep going."

Tate then faced Julie Kedzie at Strikeforce: Rousey vs. Kaufman on August 18, 2012. In a striker-versus-grappler match-up, Tate endured two head-kicks and was knocked down twice. She subdued Kedzie with a fight-ending armbar in the third round.

Ultimate Fighting Championship

Following Strikeforce's fold, Tate officially joined the Ultimate Fighting Championship (UFC) in February 2013. Company president Dana White credited her fight with Ronda Rousey for bringing women's MMA to the promotion. The UFC announced that she would face Cat Zingano on April 13 at The Ultimate Fighter 17 Finale.

Regarding her long-term goals, Tate said, "Becoming a champion means more to me than anything—more than a rematch, more than anything. That's something that when I'm 80 years old someday and I have kids and grandkids I can look back and say, 'Look, this is what I did. This is my accomplishment.' So that's my ultimate goal."

Prior to the fight, it was revealed that the winner of Tate vs. Zingano would receive a title shot against Rousey, who became the inaugural UFC Women's Bantamweight Champion due to Strikeforce and the UFC being owned by the same company. It was also revealed that the winner would coach against Rousey on the 18th edition of The Ultimate Fighter, a UFC reality show.

Despite winning the first two rounds, Tate lost in the final round by TKO. Tate argued that the stoppage was premature. The back-and-forth action earned both women a Fight of the Night bonus. On May 28, it was announced that Zingano had withdrawn as Rousey's opponent and opposing coach after suffering a knee injury which required surgery, and had been replaced by Tate.

First title shot
Prior to their rematch, Rousey expressed respect for Tate's fighting ability, and declared her appreciation for their rivalry. Tate remarked, "We have our definite disagreements, but I give her credit for what she's done and where she's got in the sport of women's MMA. Without her, I don't think we'd be as far so I do value that."

The rematch took place at UFC 168 on December 28, 2013. The fight was largely one-sided, in Rousey's favor, though Tate did manage to take Rousey beyond the first round, coming back from several of Rousey's takedowns and even causing the crowd to rally behind her towards the end of round 2. After escaping two submission attempts, Tate lost to an armbar in the third round.

First UFC victories
Tate faced Liz Carmouche in the co-main event at UFC on Fox: Werdum vs. Browne on April 19, 2014. She won the fight via unanimous decision, earning her first win in the UFC. Tate then faced promotion newcomer Rin Nakai at UFC Fight Night: Hunt vs. Nelson on September 20, 2014. She won the fight via unanimous decision, making Tate 2–2 in the UFC.

Tate faced Sara McMann at UFC 183 on January 31, 2015. Tate surprised many in the MMA community by out-grappling McMann, an Olympic medalist in wrestling, for the majority of round 3, winning the fight by majority decision (29–28, 29–27, and 28–28). Following Tate's third UFC victory, FoxSports.com declared that Tate had "proven to be the top fighter in the world at 135 pounds outside of the champion".

On March 20, 2015, it was announced that Tate would face Jessica Eye in a bout on July 25, 2015, at UFC on Fox: Dillashaw vs. Barão 2. Given the significance of the fight, which was initially promoted as a top-contender bout, Tate remarked that she expected "the best Jessica Eye that anyone has ever seen," and called Eye a tough opponent. Tate won the fight by unanimous decision.

UFC Champion
On November 14, 2015, Holly Holm defeated Rousey for the UFC Bantamweight Championship. In January 2016, the UFC announced that Tate would be the first title defense for Holm at UFC 196 on March 5, 2016. After a back-and-forth four rounds that saw both fighters displaying an advantage, Tate defeated Holm via a technical submission due to a rear-naked choke in the fifth round to become the new UFC Bantamweight Champion. The win also earned Tate her first Performance of the Night bonus award.

Following Tate's victory over Holm, UFC president Dana White quickly announced that Tate's first title defense would be against Ronda Rousey at a yet-to-be-determined event later in 2016. However, on April 6, White revealed that Tate would instead fight Amanda Nunes in her first title defense at UFC 200 on July 9, 2016. In this fight, Nunes battered Tate with several consecutive strikes and finished her with a rear-naked choke three minutes into the first round.

Retirement
Tate fought Raquel Pennington at UFC 205 on November 12, 2016. Prior to the event, Tate stated that she intended to take a hiatus from MMA after the bout. She also agreed to a grappling-only rematch with Jessica Eye at a Submission Underground show on December 11, 2016. After losing to Pennington via unanimous decision, Tate announced her retirement from mixed martial arts. "I love you all so much, I've been doing this for over a decade. Thank you so much for being here, I love this sport forever but it's not my time anymore," she said after the fight.

ONE Championship
On November 7, 2018, it was reported that Tate joined ONE Championship as a Vice President. She left the job in 2021 to return to MMA

UFC return
On March 24, 2021, Tate announced she would be returning to compete in MMA against Marion Reneau on July 17, 2021, at UFC on ESPN: Makhachev vs. Moisés. She won the fight via third round TKO. This win earned her the second  Performance of the Night award in her UFC career.

Tate was scheduled to face Ketlen Vieira on October 16, 2021, at UFC Fight Night 195.  However, on September 22, the bout was pulled from the card when Tate tested positive for COVID-19. The bout was rebooked on November 20, 2021, at UFC Fight Night 198. She lost the bout via unanimous decision.

Move to Flyweight
Tate was scheduled to face Lauren Murphy in a flyweight bout on May 14, 2022, at UFC on ESPN 36. However, the bout was moved to UFC 276 due to unknown reasons.  In turn, a week before that event, Murphy pulled out after she tested positive for COVID-19. The bout was then rescheduled and eventually took place on July 16, 2022, at UFC on ABC 3. Tate lost the fight via unanimous decision.

Return to Bantamweight
Tate is scheduled to face Mayra Bueno Silva on June 3, 2023 at UFC Fight Night 226.

Fighting style
Tate is known for her extensive knowledge of grappling arts, including wrestling, jiu-jitsu, and submission defense; her wrestling-heavy style lead to her first nickname, "Takedown". In July 2011, Tate won the Strikeforce Bantamweight Championship by becoming the first woman to ever submit Marloes Coenen in an MMA bout. During her win at UFC 183, Tate out-grappled Olympic wrestling medalist Sara McMann. She is also noted for being the first fighter to escape Ronda Rousey's armbar on multiple occasions. Following their first bout in March 2012, Rousey described Tate as "much more savvy on the ground than I anticipated."

During the earlier phase of her career, Tate was generally noted for her double-leg takedowns, usually performed by picking an opponent up while pressing them against the cage. From top position, she typically attacked from side control as opposed to mount; in a rear position, she would usually secure a body triangle and attack with strikes. Having won multiple titles in wrestling, Tate was well known for her power on the ground, which often allowed her to hold opponents in vulnerable positions.

Tate has extensive training in Brazilian jiu-jitsu. When attacking from her guard, she usually attempted an armbar or a triangle choke. She employed a variety of submissions while grappling with opponents, including heel hooks, guillotines, and kimura locks. During her fight against Julie Kedzie, she also used a triangle to transition to mount.

Numerous media outlets, including Yahoo! and FoxSports.com, described her ground game as "powerful" and "dominant," noting that Tate's opponents were often overwhelmed if taken down. Julie Kedzie typically avoided going to the ground with Tate throughout the duration of their fight. During their bout at UFC 168, Ronda Rousey repeatedly blocked and reversed Tate's takedown attempts.

While standing, Tate typically used left jabs, left hooks, a right cross, an overhand right, and knees from a clinch.

Multi-media appearances and sponsorships
Tate appears in the award-winning mixed martial arts documentary Fight Life. The film is directed by James Z. Feng and was released in 2013. The film's DVD bonus materials include a featurette on Tate and boyfriend Bryan Caraway. Tate is featured as a playable character in the video game EA Sports UFC. In 2015, Tate was announced as a cast member of the feature film Fight Valley, which follows women competing in an underground fight club.

She appeared nude in the 2013 ESPN Body Issue, and also appeared on the December 2013 cover of Fitness Gurls magazine, which labeled Tate "the most beautiful woman in MMA."

In 2014, Tate became the second MMA fighter (after Donald Cerrone) to join NASCAR driver Kevin Harvick's KHI Management company. Afterward, Tate gained sponsorship deals with NASCAR and Budweiser.

As of September 2021, Tate co-hosts the show Throwing Down With Renee and Miesha on Sirius XM with Renee Paquette.

In 2022, Tate was the winner of third season of Celebrity Big Brother, in which she won four Head of Household competitions.

Personal life
Tate is a fan of the Seattle Seahawks. Tate attended Central Washington University, where she met her ex-boyfriend Bryan Caraway. In 2014, Tate was credited by Caraway with saving the life of his mother, Chris Caraway, when she suffered an asthma attack while scuba diving, stopped breathing and became completely unresponsive.

On September 5, 2016, she helped carry a six-year-old girl with a broken arm while hiking in Nevada.

On January 1, 2018, Tate announced that she was in a relationship with fellow MMA fighter Johnny Nuñez. On June 4, 2018, she gave birth to their daughter, Amaia Nevaeh Nuñez. On December 25, 2019, Tate announced that she was pregnant with their second child. On June 14, 2020, she gave birth to their son, Daxton Wylder Nuñez.

Championships and accomplishments

Mixed martial arts
 Ultimate Fighting Championship
 UFC Women's Bantamweight Championship (One time)
Fight of the Night (Two times) vs. Cat Zingano, Ronda Rousey
Performance of the Night (Two time) 
Strikeforce
Strikeforce Women's Bantamweight Championship
Strikeforce 2010 Women's Bantamweight Tournament Winner
Freestyle Cage Fighting
FCF Women's Bantamweight Championship
World MMA Awards
2011 Female Fighter of the Year
2016 Comeback of the Year vs. Holly Holm at UFC 196
BloodyElbow.com
2013 WMMA Fight of the Year  vs. Ronda Rousey on December 28
MMADNA.nl
2016 Comeback of the Year vs. Holly Holm

Submission grappling
2009 World Team Trials Silver Medalist
2008 FILA Grappling World Championships Senior Women' No-Gi Silver Medalist
2008 World Team Trials National Grappling Champion

Mixed martial arts record

|Loss
|align=center|19–9
|Lauren Murphy
|Decision (unanimous)
|UFC on ABC: Ortega vs. Rodríguez
|
|align=center|3
|align=center|5:00
|Elmont, New York, United States
|
|-
|Loss
|align=center|19–8
|Ketlen Vieira
|Decision (unanimous)
|UFC Fight Night: Vieira vs. Tate
|
|align=center|5
|align=center|5:00
|Las Vegas, Nevada, United States
|
|-
|Win
|align=center|19–7
|Marion Reneau
|TKO (punches)
|UFC on ESPN: Makhachev vs. Moisés
|
|align=center|3
|align=center|1:53
|Las Vegas, Nevada, United States
|
|-
|Loss
|align=center|18–7
|Raquel Pennington
|Decision (unanimous)
|UFC 205
|
|align=center|3
|align=center|5:00
|New York City, New York, United States
|
|-
|Loss
|align=center|18–6
|Amanda Nunes
|Submission (rear-naked choke)
|UFC 200 
|
|align=center|1
|align=center|3:16
|Las Vegas, Nevada, United States
|
|-
|Win
|align=center|18–5
|Holly Holm
|Technical Submission (rear-naked choke)
|UFC 196 
|
|align=center|5
|align=center|3:30
|Las Vegas, Nevada, United States
|
|-
| Win
| align=center| 17–5
| Jessica Eye
| Decision (unanimous)
| UFC on Fox: Dillashaw vs. Barão 2
| 
| align=center| 3
| align=center| 5:00
| Chicago, Illinois, United States
| 
|-
| Win
| align=center| 16–5
| Sara McMann
| Decision (majority)
| UFC 183
| 
| align=center| 3
| align=center| 5:00
| Las Vegas, Nevada, United States
| 
|-
| Win
| align=center| 15–5
| Rin Nakai
| Decision (unanimous)
| UFC Fight Night: Hunt vs. Nelson
| 
| align=center| 3
| align=center| 5:00
| Saitama, Japan
| 
|-
| Win
| align=center| 14–5
| Liz Carmouche
| Decision (unanimous)
| UFC on Fox: Werdum vs. Browne
| 
| align=center| 3
| align=center| 5:00
| Orlando, Florida, United States
| 
|-
| Loss
| align=center| 13–5
| Ronda Rousey
| Submission (armbar)
| UFC 168
| 
| align=center| 3
| align=center| 0:58
| Las Vegas, Nevada, United States
| 
|-
| Loss
| align=center| 13–4
| Cat Zingano
| TKO (knees and elbow)
| The Ultimate Fighter: Team Jones vs. Team Sonnen Finale
| 
| align=center| 3
| align=center| 2:55
| Las Vegas, Nevada, United States
| 
|-
| Win
| align=center| 13–3
| Julie Kedzie
| Submission (armbar)
| Strikeforce: Rousey vs. Kaufman
| 
| align=center| 3
| align=center| 3:28
| San Diego, California, United States
| 
|-
| Loss
| align=center| 12–3
| Ronda Rousey
|Technical Submission (armbar)
| Strikeforce: Tate vs. Rousey
| 
| align=center| 1
| align=center| 4:27
| Columbus, Ohio, United States
| 
|-
| Win
| align=center| 12–2
| Marloes Coenen
| Submission (arm-triangle choke)
| Strikeforce: Fedor vs. Henderson
| 
| align=center| 4
| align=center| 3:03
| Hoffman Estates, Illinois, United States
| 
|-
| Win
| align=center| 11–2
| Hitomi Akano
| Decision (unanimous)
| rowspan=2|Strikeforce Challengers: Riggs vs. Taylor
| rowspan=2|
| align=center| 3
| align=center| 3:00
| rowspan=2|Phoenix, Arizona, United States
| 
|-
| Win
| align=center| 10–2
| Maiju Kujala
| Decision (unanimous)
| align=center| 2
| align=center| 3:00
| 
|-
| Win
| align=center| 9–2
| Zoila Frausto Gurgel
| Submission (armbar)
| Strikeforce Challengers: Johnson vs. Mahe
| 
| align=center| 2
| align=center| 4:09
| Fresno, California, United States
| 
|-
| Win
| align=center| 8–2
| Valerie Coolbaugh
| Submission (armbar)
| Freestyle Cage Fighting 38
| 
| align=center| 1
| align=center| 4:45
| Tulsa, Oklahoma, United States
| 
|-
| Win
| align=center| 7–2
| Sarah Oriza
| KO (head kick)
| CageSport MMA
| 
| align=center| 2
| align=center| 0:08
| Tacoma, Washington, United States
| 
|-
| Loss
| align=center| 6–2
| Sarah Kaufman
| Decision (unanimous)
| Strikeforce Challengers: Evangelista vs. Aina
| 
| align=center| 3
| align=center| 3:00
| Fresno, California, United States
| 
|-
| Win
| align=center| 6–1
| Lizbeth Carreiro
| Submission (shoulder choke)
| Freestyle Cage Fighting 30
| 
| align=center| 3
| align=center| 2:48
| Shawnee, Oklahoma, United States
| 
|-
| Win
| align=center| 5–1
| Dora Baptiste
| Submission (triangle choke)
| Atlas Fights: USA vs. Brazil
| 
| align=center| 1
| align=center| 1:48
| Biloxi, Mississippi, United States
| 
|-
| Win
| align=center| 4–1
| Jessica Bednark
| TKO (punches)
| Freestyle Cage Fighting 27
| 
| align=center| 1
| align=center| 1:22
| Shawnee, Oklahoma, United States
| 
|-
| Win
| align=center| 3–1
| Jamie Lynn Welsh
| TKO (punches)
| CageSport MMA
| 
| align=center| 1
| align=center| 2:21
| Tacoma, Washington, United States
| 
|-
| Win
| align=center| 2–1
| Elaina Maxwell
| Decision (unanimous)
| Strikeforce: Melendez vs. Thomson
| 
| align=center| 3
| align=center| 3:00
| San Jose, California, United States
| 
|-
| Loss
| align=center| 1–1
| Kaitlin Young
| KO (head kick)
| rowspan=2|HOOKnSHOOT: BodogFIGHT 2007 Women's Tournament
| rowspan=2|
| align=center| 1
| align=center| 0:30
| rowspan=2|Evansville, Indiana, United States
| 
|-
| Win
| align=center| 1–0
| Jan Finney
| Decision (referee decision)
| align=center| 4
| align=center| 3:00
|

See also
 List of female mixed martial artists

References

External links

 
 

1986 births
Living people
American female sport wrestlers
American practitioners of Brazilian jiu-jitsu
Female Brazilian jiu-jitsu practitioners
American female mixed martial artists
Ultimate Fighting Championship female fighters
Ultimate Fighting Championship champions
Bantamweight mixed martial artists
Mixed martial artists utilizing wrestling
Mixed martial artists utilizing Brazilian jiu-jitsu
Central Washington University alumni
Female models from Washington (state)
Mixed martial artists from Washington (state)
Sportspeople from Tacoma, Washington
21st-century American women
Participants in American reality television series
ONE Championship